IPSC Armenia, also known as the Practical Shooting Federation of Armenia is the governing body for practical shooting in Armenia. Its headquarters are located in Yerevan.

History 
Artyom Gorgyan is the current president of the Federation. The Federation is a full member of the International Practical Shooting Confederation, within the "European Zone".

Activities 
In August 2015, the Federation organized the "You Can Defend Yourself" program in collaboration with the Japan Karate Association of Armenia, in which disabled persons were provided with shooting lessons and martial arts training.

The Federation hosts various shooting tournaments in Armenia. On 24 December 2018, the Federation held the "Pan-Armenian Sniper Shooting Tournament" in coordination with the Ministry of Defence of Armenia. The participants were mostly from law enforcement agencies of Armenia and Artsakh, as well as civilian snipers. The former Minister of Defence, David Tonoyan, was in attendance.

See also 

 Armenian Shooting Federation

External links 
 IPSC Armenia on Facebook

References 

Regions of the International Practical Shooting Confederation
Sports governing bodies in Armenia
Shooting sports in Armenia